The Tupelo Automobile Museum was located in Tupelo, Mississippi. This museum had over one hundred cars. Consisting of the late Frank Spain's personal collection which totalled 150 vehicles, the cars ranged from antique, rare, and celebrity and were displayed in chronological order to illustrate the history of automotive design and innovation. The museum closed in 2019.

Collection 
The museum had over one hundred cars on display. Some of the cars were: a Tucker 48, an 1899 Knox, a 1964 Leslie, a never driven Dodge Viper, and a 1976 Lincoln Mark IV. The specially built "Leslie Special" was in the film The Great Race. The 1976 Lincoln Mark IV was once owned by Elvis Presley. The museum also featured Hispano-Suizas.

References

External links
 Tupelo Automobile Museum - official site

Museums in Lee County, Mississippi
Automobile museums in Mississippi
Buildings and structures in Tupelo, Mississippi